Schwab Verkehrstechnik AG is a Swiss manufacturer of energy absorption systems for railway vehicles. The company develops, manufactures and markets basically two product lines: couplings and buffers.

Basics 
The company is based in Schaffhausen, Switzerland and employed, by end of 2011, 39 people.

It was acquired in 2012 by Faiveley Transport.

References 

Engineering companies of Switzerland
Schaffhausen